Peter Halldorf (born 21 June 1958) is a Swedish Pentecostal pastor, self-taught theologian, and writer. He is known for exploring Patristics, particularly the Desert Fathers, within a Pentecostal context. His interest has led him to be dubbed "The Pentecostal Monk" and sometimes prays in Coptic monasteries. He is a third generation Pentecostal preacher who became interested in the Desert Fathers out of concerns Pentecostalism could fall into worldliness or shallowness. He also found an ultimate "gentleness" in much of the Desert Fathers stories. Peter Halldorf is additionally a two-time winner of the Emmausprisen for Christian writing.

References

External links 
Ekumeniska Kommuniteten (Swedish)
Pilgrim (Swedish)

Swedish Pentecostal pastors
20th-century Protestant theologians
1958 births
Living people